Borneol is a bicyclic organic compound and a terpene derivative. The hydroxyl group in this compound is placed in an endo position. The exo diastereomer is called isoborneol. Being chiral, borneol exists as enantiomers, both of which are found in nature.

Reactions 
Borneol is oxidized to the ketone (camphor).

Occurrence 
The compound was named in 1842 by the French chemist Charles Frédéric Gerhardt.  Borneol can be found in several species of Heterotheca, Artemisia, Rosmarinus officinalis (rosemary) Dipterocarpaceae, Blumea balsamifera  and Kaempferia galanga.

It is one of the chemical compounds found in castoreum. This compound is gathered from the beaver's plant food.

Synthesis
Borneol can be synthesized by reduction of camphor by the Meerwein–Ponndorf–Verley reduction (a reversible process). Reduction of camphor with sodium borohydride (fast and irreversible) gives instead the diastereomer isoborneol.

Uses 
Whereas d-borneol was the enantiomer that used to be the most readily available commercially, the more commercially available enantiomer now is l-borneol, which also occurs in nature.

Borneol from Dipterocarpus spp. is used in traditional Chinese medicine. An early description is found in the Bencao Gangmu.

Borneol is a component of many essential oils and it is a natural insect repellent. It also generates a TRPM8-mediated cooling sensation similar to menthol.

Laevo-borneol is used in perfumery. It has a balsamic odour type with pine, woody and camphoraceous facets.

Toxicology 
Borneol may cause eye, skin, and respiratory irritation; it is harmful if swallowed. Acute exposure may cause headache, nausea, vomiting, dizziness, lightheadedness, and syncope. Exposure to higher levels or over a longer period of time may cause restlessness, difficulty concentrating, irritability, and seizures.

Skin irritation 
Borneol has been shown to have little to no irritation effect when applied to the human skin at doses used in fine fragrance formulation. Skin exposure can lead to sensitization and a future allergic reaction even to small quantities.

Derivatives
The bornyl group is a univalent radical C10H17 derived from borneol by removal of hydroxyl and is also known as 2-bornyl. Isobornyl is the univalent radical C10H17 that is derived from isoborneol. The structural isomer fenchol is also a widely used compound derived from certain essential oils.

Bornyl acetate is the acetate ester of borneol.

Notes and references

External links 
 NIST datasheet including full spectroscopic data
 Borneol in Chinese medicine

Secondary alcohols
Monoterpenes
GABAA receptor positive allosteric modulators
Bicyclic compounds
Cyclopentanes